is a Japanese video game musician working for Nintendo, where he is notable for composing music in many titles of the Metroid series, mainly Super Metroid and the Prime trilogy. Yamamoto also plays a role as a music director at Nintendo, overseeing the audio for several of their games. He frequently collaborates with fellow composers Minako Hamano and Masaru Tajima.

Yamamoto utilizes heavy drums, piano, voiced chants, clangs of pipes, and electric guitar. In development of Super Metroid, Yamamoto came up with some of the game's themes by humming them to himself while riding his motorcycle home from work. He was asked to compose the music for Metroid Prime to reinforce the series' continuity. The game's Dolby Pro Logic II surround sound was mixed by a member of Dolby Digital. Developers from Retro Studios noted how the process of fitting all the sound effects for a world in Metroid Prime into 6 MB of space was crucial in producing a quality aural experience, as each sound had to be of very high quality to be included. Metroid Prime 3: Corruption took advantage of the increase in the amount of RAM that took place when the series switched from the GameCube to the Wii; this allowed for higher quality audio samples to be used and thus a better overall audio quality.

The music from Metroid and other games have been played by ensembles and concerts. An orchestral arrangement of his music is included in PLAY! A Video Game Symphony that toured the United States and Europe and made its Asian debut at the 2007 Singapore Arts Festival.

In an interview with Music4Games, Yamamoto detailed his experience working on the Metroid Prime trilogy. He described his thoughts on the inclusion of themes from Super Metroid as well as his composition process and sources of inspiration. He intends to continue working on the Metroid series into the future.

Works

References

External links
Composer profile at OverClocked ReMix

1964 births
Japanese composers
Japanese male composers
Living people
Metroid
Nintendo people
Video game composers